Municipal Stadium of Edessa is a multi-choice stadium based in Edessa. The stadium's main stand consists of 6,000 chairs but when Edessaikos F.C. was playing in the Greek Superleague the stadium often accommodated about 10,000 fans. In the stadium also participating athletics since has appropriate facilities. Moreover, the stadium contains the old Basketball court of Edessa and the municipal gym and a small grass area in back of the unused rear stand. The stadium is located in the center of the city.

Multi-purpose stadiums in Greece
Football venues in Greece
Sports venues in Central Macedonia
Buildings and structures in Edessa, Greece